PMMP (Philippe Mounier Marketing Production) is a French production company that was created in 1987 specializing in animation, and educational contents

Productions

Series 
 Costa (100 x 5'), TF1
 Dr. Zitbag's Transylvania Pet Shop (65 x 26') in association with ITV, TF1, TVE & Ravensburger Film & TV.
 Dirty Jokes (26 x 35'), based on the cult strips by famous French cartoonist Philippe Vuillemin.
 Inspector Mouse (26 x 24')based on the work of Ralph Steadman, in association with France 2 & Ravensburger Film & TV. Finalist Emmy Awards 1999.
 Pim (104 x 13')first Franco-Korean co-production with Samsung Entertainment.
 Doc Eureka (39 x 7') coproduction with France 3 and La Cinquième. Finalist Emmy Awards 2001
 Delook & Sharpy (104 x 7') TF1
 Marcelino Pan y Vino ( 26 x 26')in association with VipToons, Nippon Animation for RAI, TVE and TF1.
 Odd Family (26 x 22')coproduction with SamG Animation, Timoon Animation for TF1. First sitcom produced in 3D.
 Forest Friends (52 x 13') in association with TF1 and Timoon Animation
 Boowa & Kwala (52 x 5')in association with ITV GRANADA and UpToTen.com
 My Giant Friend (52 x 13')coproduction with SamG Animation and Timoon Animation for France 3, Canal J. Series made in 3D.
 Marcelino (52 x 24'), TF1

Films 
 David Copperfield (120') co-produced with ASTRAL INC and NBCNP for NBC.
 Loulou de Montmartre (80') in development with Project Images with the support of Centre National du Cinema et de l'Image Animée
 Les Enfants de la Forêt (79') in development with Pipangaï.

Short films 
 The Doobles by Philippe Tierney
 The Little Mermaid by André Lindon

Documentary 
 The Secret Story of the beginnings of the conquest of space by André Annosse

Various 
 L'Ami Baba lesavoirpourtous.org
 B.A.Ba TV lesavoirpourtous.org
 Je Parle donc Je Suis ACIA

References

External links 
 
 uptoten.com

Mass media companies established in 1986
Film production companies of France